The Jean Arthur Show is an American situation comedy that aired on CBS from September 12 to December 5, 1966. The series was sponsored by General Foods.

Cast
Jean Arthur as Patricia, a lawyer who works alongside her son Paul
Ron Harper as Paul Marshall, a lawyer who works alongside his mother Patricia
Richard Conte as Richie Wells, an ex-gangster with a romantic interest in Patricia
Leonard Stone as Morton, the chauffeur of the lawyer duo

Guest stars
Ray Bolger
Michael Constantine
Clint Howard
Mickey Rooney
Olan Soule
Dick Wilson

Reception
The Jean Arthur Show ranked number 65 in the ratings, and lasted only 12 episodes.

Episodes

References

External links 
 

1966 American television series debuts
1966 American television series endings
1960s American legal television series
1960s American sitcoms
1960s American workplace comedy television series
CBS original programming
English-language television shows
Television series by Universal Television
Television shows set in Los Angeles